Jimmy Thoronka (born 6 June 1994) is a professional sprinter from Sierra Leone. He defected from his native country to live in England after competing in the 2014 Commonwealth Games. His mother and four siblings were killed by ebola, and he was arrested in March 2015 while living on the streets in London for "running while black". He then had a legal battle with the government of the United Kingdom after his application to stay was rejected.

In May 2018, he was granted the ability to stay in the UK.

Major international competitions

Domestic competitions

References 

Living people
1994 births
Sierra Leonean male sprinters
British male sprinters
Athletes (track and field) at the 2014 Commonwealth Games
Commonwealth Games competitors for Sierra Leone